Charles Brand (November 1, 1871 – May 23, 1966) was a U.S. Representative from Ohio.

Born in Urbana, Ohio, Brand attended the graded schools of his native city and Ohio Wesleyan University, Delaware, Ohio.
He engaged in agricultural pursuits, manufacturing, and banking at Urbana.
He served as member and president of the Urbana City Council 1911–1912.
He served as member of the Ohio State Senate in 1921 and 1922.
He served as a member of the advisory committee of the War Finance Corporation in 1921.

Brand was elected as a Republican to the Sixty-eighth and to the four succeeding Congresses (March 4, 1923 – March 3, 1933).
He was not a candidate for renomination in 1932.
He resumed former business pursuits until his retirement.
He died in Melbourne Beach, Florida, May 23, 1966.
He was interred in Melbourne Cemetery.

Sources

External links

 

1871 births
1966 deaths
Republican Party members of the United States House of Representatives from Ohio
People from Urbana, Ohio
Ohio Wesleyan University alumni
Republican Party Ohio state senators
American bankers
People from Melbourne Beach, Florida